is a Japanese professional rock and sport climber. She participates in lead climbing, bouldering and speed climbing competitions.

Biography
Kotake was born on May 18, 1997 in Sapporo, Hokkaido. She started bouldering in the fifth grade of elementary school. In 2014 she won the All Japan Climbing Youth Championship in the category Lead. Kotake acquired a degree at a women's college for nutrition and food science.

In 2022, Kotake sent Era Vella, an sport climb in Margalef, Spain.

Rankings

IFSC Climbing World Championships

IFSC Climbing World Cup

Asian Championships

Asian Cup

References

External links
JMSCA profile

1997 births
Living people
Japanese rock climbers